Bioscope is a 2008 Malayalam film produced by National Film Development Corporation of India (NFDC) and was directed by K. M. Madhusudhanan.The music  is composed  by   Chandran Veyattummal, while the cinematography is by M. J. Radhakrishnan

The film won a Special Jury award at the 56th National Film Awards and also won 5 awards in the 2008 Kerala State Film Awards.

Plot
Bioscope, set in the early years of the twentieth century, is a story of history entering the paths of memories and dreams. The story of villagers, made mute by colonialism and slavery, entering the garden of a new vision through a new machine, bioscope. The protagonist Diwakaran’s new journey starts with his acquisition of a bioscope. The Frenchman DuPont, who does bioscope shows on the coasts of Tamil Nadu, is the architect of his new journey. Diwakaran was stunned by early forms of cinema images. His relationship with DuPont and the bioscope starts with his astonishment when he first sees moving images. It turns into a story of inseparable friendship. Divakaran purchases the machine from DuPont and intends to entertain his village folks with his films, but ultimately falls prey to superstitions and suspicions about the instrument.

Production
The film is based on the book Bioscope written by K. M. Madhusudhanan. The book is based on the real-life story of Varunni Joseph, who ran bioscope shows in Kerala in 1907. The director plans to make a sequel. "Bioscope is the first part of a trilogy. The second part is titled Kannadi Kottaka (Mirror Cinema Hall) and is set in contemporary Kerala. It is about a movie house and three people who are connected to it," says Madhusudhanan.

Cast
 Walter Wagner as Dupont
 Murugan as Diwakaran
 Ramgopal Bajaj as Kaimal
 Nedumbaram Gopi as Murugan Nair
 Bharathan Najrakkal as Kumaran
 T. V. Gangadharan as Inspector
 Mekha Rajan as Nalini
 Kuttiyedathi Vilasini as Ammini
 Nilamboor ayesha as Malu
 Anusha Mohan as mute girl

Awards and accolades
 56th National Film Awards
 Special Jury award

 2008 Kerala State Film Awards
Kerala State Film Award (Special Mention) - K. M. Madhusudhanan
Best Editor - Beena Paul
Best Cinematographer - M. J. Radhakrishnan
Best Background Music - Chandran Veyattummal
Best Processing Lab - Chithranjali Studio

 NETPAC Jury Award (Indian Competition section) - OSIAN's Cinefan Asian & Arab Film Festival, 2008 
 SAIFF 2008, New York - Best Cinematography 
 International Filmfestival Mannheim-Heidelberg, 2008 - Special mention of the International Jury

References

External links
 Bioscope film - Official page

2000s Malayalam-language films
Indian films based on actual events
Indian biographical films
Films scored by Chandran Veyattummal
Films set in the 1900s
Special Jury Award (feature film) National Film Award winners
2000s biographical films